E500 can refer to:

 Alexander Dennis Enviro500, a tri-axle double-decker bus from Alexander Dennis
 E number 500, a food additive
 Eclipse 500, a business jet aeroplane
 Error 500, an "Internal Server Error" on a HTTP-Server
 Gurgel E500, an electric vehicle produced in Brazil
 Mercedes-Benz E500, a luxury sports sedan automobile
 Olympus E-500, a digital SLR camera
 PowerPC e500, a microprocessor core from Freescale
 Sharp PC-E500S, a pocket computer by Sharp Corporation